Hamilton Fish IV or Hamilton Fish Jr.  (June 3, 1926 – July 23, 1996) was an American Republican politician who represented parts of New York's Hudson Valley region in the United States House of Representatives for thirteen terms from 1969 to 1995.  Fish was a member of the prominent Fish political family; his grandfather and father, both also named Hamilton, represented the region from 1909 to 1911 and 1920 to 1945, respectively.

Early life
Fish was born in Washington, D.C., the son of Grace Chapin and Hamilton Fish III (1888–1991).  His grandfathers were Hamilton Fish II (1849–1936) and Alfred C. Chapin, who were both lawyers and politicians. He was a great-grandson of Hamilton Fish (1808–1893), and a descendant of Lewis Morris and John Kean.

He attended Kent School, a private school, and graduated from Harvard University in 1949. He received an LL.B. from New York University School of Law in 1957. He also attended Harvard Kennedy School. While in college, Fish was a member of the United States Naval Reserve.

Career
From 1951 to 1953, Fish served with the United States Foreign Service and was posted as vice consul to Ireland. He practiced law privately before his election to the House, and in 1961, Fish served as a lawyer for the New York State Assembly's Judiciary Committee.

U.S. Congress
Fish was a candidate for the 90th Congress in 1966.  While he won the Republican primary, he was defeated in the general election by Democrat Joseph Y. Resnick.   In the 1968 Republican primary, he defeated G. Gordon Liddy, and went on to win in the general election that year.  He served in the 91st United States Congress, and was re-elected to the 12 succeeding Congresses, serving from January 3, 1969, to January 3, 1995.

As a member of the U.S. House Committee on the Judiciary in 1974, he voted in favor of the first two of the three articles of impeachment (for obstruction of justice and abuse of power) of President Richard Nixon during the impeachment process against Nixon.

Fish twice served as an House impeachment manager, being among those who successfully prosecuted the cases against Judges Harry E. Claiborne and Alcee Hastings in their impeachment trials.

Personal life
In 1951, Fish was married to Julia MacKenzie (1927–1969), who was born in Montreal, Quebec, and was the daughter of Ellice MacKenzie.  Together, they were the parents of:

 Hamilton Fish V  (b. 1952), who ran for Congress in 1988 and 1994 as a Democrat without success. He is married to Sandra Harper.
 Julia Alexandria "Alexa" Fish (b. 1953), who married Thomas Ward, a descendant of Samuel Gray Ward.
 Nicholas Stuyvesant Fish (1958–2020), also a Democrat who was chairman of Manhattan Community Board 5.   Member of the Portland City Council 2008–2020.
 Peter Livingston Fish (b. 1959)

After Julia's death in a car accident in 1969, he married Billy Laster Cline (1924–1985), the daughter of Mayne E. Laster (1903–1972), a cattle rancher, and Mildred (née Greenwood) Laster (1912–1987), in 1971. They remained married until her death in 1985.  In 1988, he married Mary Ann Tinklepaugh (b. 1930), a Deputy Assistant Secretary of Commerce in the Reagan and Bush administrations.

Fish died at his home in Washington, D.C., on July 23, 1996.

See also

 List of members of the American Legion

References

External links

Biography and index to papers
 FBI file at Internet Archive
 
 Desmond-Fish Library  Public Library co-founded by Hamilton Fish IV. Library has many Fish family artifacts, papers and portraits on display.
 LiSA (Livingston-Svirsky Archive)  Contains many online documents on the Fish Family.
 

|-

1926 births
1996 deaths
Hamilton IV
Harvard University alumni
Kent School alumni
New York (state) lawyers
New York University School of Law alumni
Politicians from Putnam County, New York
Republican Party members of the United States House of Representatives from New York (state)
20th-century American lawyers
20th-century American politicians
People from Millbrook, New York
United States Navy personnel of World War II
United States Navy reservists